Jhapa XI is a football club that represents Jhapa district in the Nepal National Football League.

Jhapa XI is participating in Nepal National League for the first time in the season 2015. All of the players of Jhapa XI are home based, none of the players are foreign based.

Current squad
As of April, 2018

Honours

Domestic
Nepal National League 
Fourth (1): 2015
ANFA Cup 
Champions (1): 2014
Birat Gold Cup 
Champions (1): 2015
Jhapa Gold Cup 
Runners-up (4): 2016, 2017, 2018, 2019
Birat Gold Cup 
Quarter-finals (1): 2015

Invitational
Sikkim Governor's Gold Cup
Runners-up (1): 2016

References

Football clubs in Nepal
2014 establishments in Nepal